Alakapura is a village in the southern state of Karnataka, India. It is located in the Gauribidanur taluk of Chikkaballapura district in Karnataka. It is situated 8 km away from sub-district headquarter Gauribidanur and 36 km away from district headquarter Chikkaballapura.

Demographics
According to Census 2011 information the location code or village code of Alakapura village is 623348.  Alakapura village is also a gram panchayat. Villages comes under Alakapura gram Panchayat are Rayarekalahalli, Pothenahalli, Nandiganahalli, Hanumenahalli, Doddahanumenahalli, Chikkahanumenahalli and Alakapura.

The total geographical area of village is 625.59 hectares. Alakapura has a total population of 3,208 peoples with 1,653 males and 1,555 females. There are about 734 houses in Alakapura village. Gauribidanur is nearest town to Alakapura which is approximately 8 km away.

Economy
People belonging to the Alakapura village grow very much maize, millet silk, etc. The major occupations of the residents of Alakapura are dairy farming. The dairy cooperative is the largest individual milk supplying cooperative in the state.

Facilities
Alakapura has below types of facilities.

 Government higher primary School
 Government high School
 Jnanodaya Vidya Samsthe
 Alakapura KMF (Karnataka Milk Federation) Dairy
 Alakapura Grocery store
 Alakapura Gram Panchayat Office
 Government Primary health center
 Post Office
 Gram Panchayat Library

Temples 
 Alakapura Sri Channasomeshwara Swami Temple

See also
 Taridalu

References

External links
 https://chikkaballapur.nic.in/en/

Villages in Chikkaballapur district